Stary Onokhoy (Khuushan Onokhoi) is a rural locality (a selo) in Zaigrayevsky District, Republic of Buryatia, Russia. The population was 862 as of 2010. There are 10 streets.

Geography 
Stary Onokhoy is located 24 km northwest of Zaigrayevo (the district's administrative centre) by road. Onokhoy is the nearest rural locality.

References 

Rural localities in Zaigrayevsky District